Sirhe, Garhwa  is a village in Garhwa district of Jharkhand state of India. Meral is admin block and Arangi is the Gram Panchayat of Sirhe Village.

References
1. Reports of National Panchayat Directory
2. Location of Sirhe, Garhwa, Jharkhand, India on map
3. Sirhe Village Map

Villages in Garhwa district